The 1983 Like Cola 500, the 10th running of the event, was a NASCAR Winston Cup Series racing event held on July 24, 1983, at Pocono International Raceway in Long Pond, Pennsylvania.

Like Cola, the sponsor of the race, was an unsuccessful cola soft drink that was distributed and sold through the United States of America from 1982 to approximately 1985.

During the early 1980s, the NASCAR Winston Cup Series was plagued with top teams running big engines and finishing in third place to avoid inspection. Only manual transmission vehicles were allowed to participate in this race; a policy that NASCAR has retained to the present day.

Background 
Pocono Raceway is one of six superspeedways to hold NASCAR races; the others are Daytona International Speedway, Michigan International Speedway, Auto Club Speedway, Indianapolis Motor Speedway and Talladega Superspeedway. The track's turns are banked differently; the first is banked at 14°, the second turn at 8° and the final turn with 6°. However, each of the three straightaways are banked at 2°.

Race report
Out of the 42 drivers who tried to qualify for this event; 40 managed to qualify. John Callis and Jimmy Walker are the two drivers who failed to qualify for the race. John Callis would never return to NASCAR after failing to qualify for this race. With the exception of Canadian-born Trevor Boys, the grid was born in the United States of America. Clark Dwyer managed to receive the last-place finish due to an oil pressure issue on lap 6 in this 200-lap extravaganza. Pontiac and Buick vehicles made up the majority of the racing grid. Bobby Wawak would be the lowest-finishing driver to complete the event while Morgan Shepherd's attempt at a "top ten" finish would be sabotaged by a problematic engine on lap 193.

While Tim Richmond and Darrell Waltrip would dominate the opening laps of this event, the closing laps would see Bill Elliott, Dave Marcis and Tim Richmond exchange the first-place position during the closing laps. Richmond would eventually best Waltrip by almost two seconds in front of a live audience of 65,000 spectators driving in a used Pontiac LeMans machine as opposed to the newer Pontiac Grand Prix model. Other notable drivers in this event included Kyle Petty, J.D. McDuffie, Sterling Marlin, Benny Parsons and Buddy Arrington. Bobby Gerhart and Glenn Jarrett managed to collide into each other in a manner that would rip the entire rear end off of Gerhart's vehicle on lap 25.

The average speeds for this vehicles in this event was  while pole position winner Tim Richmond was practically sailing through the turns at speeds up to  during the solo qualifying runs. Individual race earnings varied from the winner's portion of $27,430 ($ when adjusted for inflation) to the last-place finisher's portion of $1,100 ($ when adjusted for inflation). NASCAR officials authorized a grand total of $246,500 to be awarded to all qualifying drivers for this racing event ($ when adjusted for inflation). After this event, the racing never got super-competitive at Pocono Raceway until the July 1995 running of the Miller Genuine Draft 500.

Glenn Jarrett would retire from NASCAR Cup Series racing after racing here. Notable crew chiefs who were in attendance for this race were Darrell Bryant, Joey Arrington, Elmo Langley, Dale Inman, Robin Pemberton, Bud Moore and Kirk Shelmerdine.

The most dominant drivers in the NASCAR Winston Cup Series during the 1980s were Bill Elliott, Darrell Waltrip, Terry Labonte, Bobby Allison, and Dale Earnhardt. During the early 1980s, the NASCAR Winston Cup Series was plagued with top teams running big engines and finishing in third place to avoid inspection.

Qualifying

Race

Standings after the race

References

Like Cola 500
Like Cola 500
NASCAR races at Pocono Raceway